Devils Tower is a monolith and national monument in Wyoming, U.S.

Devil's Tower may also refer to:
 Devil's Tower (film), a 2014 film
 Devil's Tower (Gibraltar), a watchtower in Gibraltar where fossil remains of Neanderthals were discovered
 Devil's Tower (mast) (Teufelsturm), main antenna mast of Bodenseesender
 Devil's Tower (oil platform), Gulf of Mexico
 Devils Tower (Tasmania), an island in northern Bass Strait, Australia
 Devils Tower, a mountain in NE Wyoming
 Devil's Tower, a 12th-century watch tower in Yelabuga, Tatarstan, Russia